Adult Contemporary is a chart published by Billboard ranking the top-performing songs in the United States in the adult contemporary music (AC) market. In 1991, 18 songs topped the chart, then published under the title Hot Adult Contemporary, based on playlists submitted by radio stations.

In the issue of Billboard dated January 5, English singer-songwriter Elton John was at number one with "You Gotta Love Someone", its fourth week atop the chart.  The song held the top spot for the first two weeks of 1991 before being displaced by "Because I Love You (the Postman Song)" by Stevie B.  The longest unbroken run at number one was achieved in August and September by Canadian singer Bryan Adams, whose song "(Everything I Do) I Do It for You" spent eight consecutive weeks in the top spot, the longest run atop the AC chart since 1979.  The song, taken from the soundtrack of the film Robin Hood: Prince of Thieves, also topped Billboards all-genre singles chart, the Hot 100, for seven weeks and was ranked by the magazine as the year's top song.  It also won the Grammy Award for Best Song Written Specifically for a Motion Picture or for Television, as well as being nominated for the Academy Award for Best Song, the first of three Oscar nominations for the singer.  Several other songs which topped the AC chart also reached the top spot on the Hot 100, including "The First Time" by Surface and "All the Man That I Need" by Whitney Houston, consecutive AC chart-toppers in February, which in addition reached number one on the Hot R&B Singles listing.

Only two artists achieved more than one number one during the year.  Amy Grant had two chart-toppers and spent a total of six weeks at number one with "Baby Baby" and "That's What Love Is For", both taken from the album Heart in Motion.  Grant had experienced significant success in the contemporary Christian music field since the late 1970s, but had begun to move into the secular market in the late 1980s.  Heart in Motion was her first album to be primarily targeted at top 40 radio, and five of its songs reached the top 5 of the AC chart.  Michael Bolton was the only artist to achieve three Hot Adult Contemporary number ones in 1991 and topped the chart for a total of ten weeks with "Love Is a Wonderful Thing", "Time, Love and Tenderness" and "When a Man Loves a Woman", giving him the highest number of weeks atop the chart of any act in 1991.  "Love Is a Wonderful Thing" was the only song to be displaced from number one and return to the top spot.  The final number one of the year was "Keep Coming Back" by Richard Marx, which spent the final two weeks of the year in the top spot.

Chart history

References

See also
1991 in music
List of artists who reached number one on the U.S. Adult Contemporary chart

1991
1991 record charts
1991 in American music